Mohammad Hazzory (also spelled Hazouri, ; born 1 January 1983 in Aleppo) is a former Syrian triple jumper.

He finished fifth at the 2003 Asian Championships, sixth at the 2005 Asian Championships and fifth at the 2006 Asian Games. He also competed at the 2004 Olympic Games without reaching the final.

His personal best jump is 16.67 metres, achieved at the 2005 Mediterranean Games in June 2005 in Almería.

Personal bests
Outdoor
Triple jump – 16.67 NR (Almería 2005)
Long jump – 7.28 m (Damascus 2000)
Indoor
Triple jump – 16.42 NR (Tehran 2004)

Competition record

References

External links 
 

1983 births
Living people
Syrian triple jumpers
Athletes (track and field) at the 2004 Summer Olympics
Olympic athletes of Syria
Athletes (track and field) at the 2006 Asian Games
Sportspeople from Aleppo
Male triple jumpers
Syrian male athletes
Asian Games competitors for Syria
Athletes (track and field) at the 2005 Mediterranean Games
Mediterranean Games competitors for Syria
Islamic Solidarity Games medalists in athletics
Islamic Solidarity Games competitors for Syria
20th-century Syrian people
21st-century Syrian people